Reginald Patrick Ground QC, known as Patrick Ground (born 9 August 1932) was a British Conservative politician and barrister.

Political career
Local level
Ground served as a councillor on the London Borough of Hammersmith from 1968 to 1971, representing the Parson's Green ward. In April 2015, he was selected locally to take the ceremonial role of president of the Feltham and Heston Conservative Association.

Parliamentary level
Ground stood as the Conservative candidate for the Feltham and Heston seat seven times, a constituency made up of the western half of the London Borough of Hounslow, between February 1974 and 1997.  He won the successive elections in 1983 and 1987, but lost in 1992 to Alan Keen, the Labour Co-operative candidate. A backbencher, Ground spoke often on subjects of local government and planning. He advocated collectivist social advancement, opposing greater direct redistribution of income and wealth. As such, in the House of Commons, he argued strongly against measuring poverty primarily in relative terms, saying:

Legal career
His specialist area of advocacy is planning law and he was called to the Bar in 1960; he was appointed Queens Counsel in 1981.  In 2015 he practised from his home address in Fulham.

Personal life and The Fulham Society
He married Caroline Dugdale in 1964.  In the 1980s he chaired the cross-party Fulham Society, a residents' association and remained a vice president into the 2010s decade with three others: a younger MP of his party, Andy Slaughter MP (Lab) and another former West London MP Lord Carrington.

References

The Times Guide to the House of Commons, Times Newspapers Ltd, 1997

1932 births
Living people
British King's Counsel
Conservative Party (UK) MPs for English constituencies
Councillors in the London Borough of Hammersmith and Fulham
English barristers
Presidents of the Oxford University Conservative Association
People educated at Beckenham and Penge County Grammar School
20th-century King's Counsel
UK MPs 1983–1987
UK MPs 1987–1992

